Upper La Taste is a town in Saint Patrick Parish, Grenada.  It is located towards the northern end of the island, along the eastern coast.

References 

Populated places in Grenada